Afshin Kamaie (born September 16, 1974) is a retired Iranian footballer.

Club career

Club career statistics

 Assist Goals

References

1974 births
Living people
Iranian footballers
Esteghlal Ahvaz players
Persian Gulf Pro League players
Association football midfielders